Rhyncolini is a tribe of beetles in the subfamily Cossoninae.

Genera 
Amasinus - Anolethrus - Anotheorus - Aphanommata - Apomimus - Apotrepus - Brachyscapus - Carphonotus - Catamimus - Caulosomus - Coptodes - Coptus - Cotasterosoma - Elassoptes - Euryrrhinus - Exostenoscelis - Eutornopsis - Heptarthrum - Hexarthroides - Himatium - Isochronanus - Leptodemasius - Macrancylus - Muschanella - Neohexarthrum - Neorhyncolus - Omeretes - Oodemas - Pachymastax - Pachyops - Pachystylus - Pentarhyncolus - Phloeophagosoma - Phloeophagus - Proleptomimus - Protamorphoceras - Protoplatypus - Pseudencoptus - Pseudocatolethrus - Pseudomimus - Pseudotanaos - Rhyncolus - Stenancylus - Stenomimodes - Stenoscelidus - Tetraclerus - Tomolips - Xenomimites - Xenotrupis

References

External links 

 Subfamily Cossoninae - atlas of weevils (Curculionidae) of Russia

Cossoninae
Beetles described in 1856
Beetle tribes